Svolvær is the administrative centre of Vågan Municipality in Nordland County, Norway. It is located on the island of Austvågøya in the Lofoten archipelago, along the Vestfjorden.

History

The first town formation known in North Norway, Vågar, was situated around the narrow, natural harbor near Kabelvåg, just west of Svolvær. Vågar is mentioned in the book Heimskringla, and might have been established as early as the year 800 AD.

Atlantic Cod fisheries, particularly during winter months, have remained one of the most important economical foundations for the town. Other industries which have proved to be valuable resources for Vågan are fish farming (salmon), Secora and Lofotkraft.

Town status
Svolvær's historical significance as an important fishing village allowed the town to be granted town status (ladested) on 1 July 1918 when the new town of Svolvær was separated from the municipality of Vågan to become its own municipality. Initially, the new municipality had 2,429 residents and it included  of land. During the 1960s, there were many municipal mergers across Norway due to the work of the Schei Committee. On 1 January 1964, Svolvær municipality was merged with the municipalities of Gimsøy and Vågan to form the new, larger municipality of Vågan as it is known today.  Prior to the merger, Svolvær had 3,952 residents.  Due to this merger, Svolvær lost its status as a "town".

Following new legislation, Svolvær was again able to declare itself a "town" in 1996.

Name
The town (and former municipality) is named after the old Svolvær farm since the town grew up on the site of the historic farm. In 1567, historical records show the name as "Suoluer". The first element of the name comes from the word  which means "cool" or "chilly".

Coat of arms
The coat of arms was granted on 20 January 1941 and it was in use until 1964 when it became part of Vågan Municipality. The official blazon is "Azure, a cod naiant argent in between a bar gemel wavy". This means the arms have a blue field (background) and the charge is a cod in between two wavy lines. The cod and wavy lines both have a tincture of argent which means it is commonly colored white, but if it is made out of metal, then silver is used. The blue color and the design of the arms symbolize the importance of the sea and fishing for the municipality. The arms were designed by John Johnsen.

Government
Svolvær was a municipality from 1916 until 1964, and during that time, it was self-governing as a municipality. During this time, it was responsible for primary education (through 10th grade), outpatient health services, senior citizen services, unemployment, social services, zoning, economic development, and municipal roads. During its existence, this municipality was governed by a municipal council of elected representatives, which in turn elected a mayor.

Municipal council
The municipal council  of Svolvær was made up of representatives that were elected to four year terms.  The party breakdown of the final municipal council was as follows:

Economy

Other than the massive fishing industry, tourism is becoming increasingly important.  Svolvær is also a major transportation hub and favourite starting point for tourists visiting the Lofoten islands. Approximately 200,000 tourists visit Svolvær each year.

A new 10-storey high combined culture scene and hotel with 160 rooms opened in March 2009. Many artists have been inspired by the unique light in Lofoten, and there are many artists and galleries in Svolvær such as the Lofoten artists house  and the Stig Tobiassen gallery.

There is also a well known World War II museum in town called the Lofoten War Memorial Museum. Whale watching tours depart from Svolvær in late autumn and winter with a focus on Orcas (killer whales). Boat excursions to nearby Raftsundet strait and its famous branch Trollfjord is also arranged from Svolvær.

Svolvær also has a downhill skiing centre, driven solely by volunteers, Kongstind Alpinsenter.  The centre has one lift, and off-piste possibilities.

The newspaper Våganavisa has been published in Svolvær since 2006.

Geography

Svolvær is located in the Lofoten archipelago on the southern coast of the island of Austvågøya, facing the open sea of the Vestfjorden to the south, and with mountains immediately to the north. The most famous mountain, Svolværgeita, had its first recorded climb in 1910.

Climate
Incredibly, despite the town's extremely northern location above the Arctic Circle Svolvær experiences an oceanic climate (Cfb) or a humid continental climate (Dfb) on the border of subpolar oceanic. This temperature anomaly results in Svolvær having an average annual temperature warmer than cities such as Quebec City located more than 20 degrees further south. Sheltered by the mountains to the north and west, the Svolvær area has less fog and experiences somewhat higher daytime temperatures in summer than the western part of Lofoten, but the same mountains also create more orographic precipitation on rainy days.  Precipitation is heaviest in autumn and winter; October averages three times as much rain as does June. Svolvær has an average frost-free season of nearly 6 months.
Highest recorded temperature is 29.7C on 18 July 2018 and lowest recorded temperature is -12.3C on 30 December 2002.

Transportation

Most of Svolvær is located on the main island of Austvågøya, but some parts of the town are built on small surrounding islands connected by bridges, including the Svinøy Bridge.  Tesla built a Supercharger in the town in 2020.  There is a regional airport near the town, Svolvær Airport, Helle, and Svolvær is a port of call for Hurtigruten.  There is a ferry connection from Svolvær to the nearby scenic island of Skrova, which also crosses the Vestfjord to Skutvik (in Hamarøy) in the summer. There is also an express boat that connects to the city of Bodø.  The Lofast road (European route E10) was officially opened on 1 December 2007, giving Svolvær access to the mainland and Harstad/Narvik Airport, Evenes. There are plans to upgrade European route E10 from Å to Harstad/Narvik Airport, Evenes. There are now scheduled bus connections to Evenes (3 hr) and Narvik (4 hr 15 min).

Museums
Museums include the Lofoten War Memorial Museum.

Twin towns
 Ancona, Italy

References

External links

Pictures and information about Svolværgeita mountain
svolvaer.net - Information about Svolvær
Picture overlooking Svolværgeita and Svolvær
Pictures from Svolvær and Skrova

Vågan
Populated places in Nordland
Cities and towns in Norway
Populated places of Arctic Norway
Viking Age populated places
Former municipalities of Norway
1918 establishments in Norway
1964 disestablishments in Norway